This is a list of electricity-generating power stations in the U.S. state of Montana, sorted by type and name. In 2019, Montana had a total summer capacity of 6,373 MW through all of its power plants, and a net generation of 27,797 GWh.  The corresponding electrical energy generation mix was 50.7% coal, 36.0% hydroelectric, 8.5% wind, 2.9% natural gas, 1.7% petroleum, 0.1% biomass and 0.1% solar.  Small-scale solar, including customer-owned photovoltaic panels, delivered an additional net 24 GWh to the state's electrical grid.  This compares as nearly equal to the generation by Montana's utility-scale solar PV plants.

During 2019, Montana exported about one-half of the electricity generated by its power plants to other states.   Montana has the largest recoverable deposits of coal in the nation, accounting for 30% of U.S. reserves.   In recent years three-quarters of the coal mined in Montana has been exported, with over one-third going to Asia via western Canada.

Nuclear power stations 
Montana had no utility-scale plants that used fissile material as a fuel in 2019.

Fossil-fuel power stations 
Data from the U.S. Energy Information Administration serves as a general reference.

Coal
A useful map of coal generation plants is provided by the Sierra Club. 

  The Hardin facility was mostly idle and is re-ramping to service cryptocurrency mining.

Natural Gas and Petroleum

 formerly Mill Creek Generating Station

Renewable power stations 
Data from the U.S. Energy Information Administration serves as a general reference.

Biomass

Hydroelectric

Additional Montana hydroelectric general references:

Wind

 formerly Mud Springs Wind

Solar

Storage power stations
Montana had no utility-scale storage power stations in 2019.   A proposed facility is the 400MW/1300MWh Gordon Butte Pumped Storage Project.

References

Lists of buildings and structures in Montana
 
Montana
Energy in Montana